Kneeshaw is a surname. Notable people with the surname include:

Frederick Kneeshaw (1883–1955), New Zealand-born Australian politician
Herbert Kneeshaw (1883–1955), English footballer
John Kneeshaw (1878–1960), British political activist
Peter Kneeshaw, Australian organist
Wilson Kneeshaw (born 1994), English footballer